St. Jonsfjorden is a fjord in Oscar II Land at Spitsbergen, Svalbard. It has a length of 21 kilometer, and opens westwards into the strait of Forlandsundet. Several glaciers debouche into the fjord, including Gaffelbreen and Konowbreen from the north, a merge of Osbornebreen, Devikbreen, Vintervegen, Paulbreen and Bukkebreen at the bottom, and Vegardbreen, Charlesbreen and Bullbreen from the south.

References

Fjords of Spitsbergen